Lluqu Qullu (Aymara lluqu heart; calabaza, "heart mountain" or "calabaza mountain", Hispanicized spelling Llococollo) is a mountain in the Barroso mountain range in the Andes of Peru, about  high. It is located in the Tacna Region, Tacna Province, Palca District, and in the Tarata Province, Tarata District.

References 

Mountains of Peru
Mountains of Tacna Region